Uniform Distortion is the third studio album by American musician and lead vocalist of My Morning Jacket Jim James. It was released on June 29, 2018 under ATO Records.

Production
Jim James explained the inspiration for the album came from the 1970s magazine Whole Earth Catalog. Inside the magazine was a photograph titled "Illuminated Man" by Duane Michals, which James used for the album cover. James wrote a letter to Duane in the hope he could use the photograph for the album. The album was produced by James and Kevin Ratterman at La La Land studio in Louisville, Kentucky.

Release
On April 17, 2018, Jim James announced the release of his third studio album, along with the first music video for "Just a Fool". The single was performed live on The Late Show with Stephen Colbert on May 24, 2018.

The second single "Throwback" was released on May 31, 2018.

Critical reception
Uniform Distortion was met with "generally favorable" reviews from critics. At Metacritic, which assigns a weighted average rating out of 100 to reviews from mainstream publications, this release received an average score of 77, based on 17 reviews. Aggregator Album of the Year gave the release a 76 out of 100 based on a critical consensus of 18 reviews.

Thom Jurek of AllMusic praised the album by saying: "The songs are wonderfully hooky tomes about self-reflection with societal jeremiads woven through. While it may not be any easier to make one's way through the distortion that James references, it is somehow easier to bear because of the empathy, joy, and contradiction in these songs." Owen Torrey of Exclaim said that the album "shears off some of the unrulier arrangements of James' earlier solo material, in favour of structures that emphasize immediacy and intensity. For the most part, the album is distinctly nostalgic in sound, chock full of sugary backing vocals, driving rhythms and splayed guitar lines." Oliver Kuscher from The Line of Best Fit explained the album "may be the most straightforward sounding a set of Jim James songs has ever released, but they’ve somehow absorbed the distortion of today’s world and turned it into something we can all make sense of, and in which we can seek some solace."

Track listing

Personnel

Musicians
 Jim James – primary artist, producer, mixing
 Jamie Drake – backing vocals
 Kathleen Grace – backing vocals
 Leslie Stevens – backing vocals
 Seth Kaufman – bass
 David Givan – drums

Production
 Bob Ludwig – mastering
 Kevin Ratterman – engineer, producer

Charts

References

External links
 Uniform Distortion at ATO Records
 
 

2018 albums
Jim James albums
ATO Records albums